Sergan (also Romanized as Sergān; also known as Sīrgān and Sīrkān) is a village in Jahliyan Rural District, in the Central District of Konarak County, Sistan and Baluchestan Province, Iran. At the 2006 census, its population was 467, in 89 families.

References 

Populated places in Konarak County